Davahchi (also Romanized as Davahchī) is a village in Zarrineh Rud Rural District, in the Central District of Miandoab County, West Azerbaijan Province, Iran. At the 2006 census, its population was 457, in 107 families.

References 

Populated places in Miandoab County